Sidney Sanabria-Robles (born February 6, 1992) is a Puerto Rican female artistic gymnast, who represented her nation at international competitions. She has won medals at international competitions and competed in the 2007 World Artistic Gymnastics Championships. In 2011, when active as a collegiate gymnast, she received a medical hardship for her knee injury that happened before a fall practice and will no longer compete.

Career
Sanabria-Robles won the silver medal on the floor at the 2006 Central American Games in Colombia.  She also competed at the 2007 World Artistic Gymnastics Championships and 2007 Pan American Games. In 2008, she won the bronze medal in vault and finished seventh on beam and floor at the 2008 Pan American Championships. She placed fifth on floor and sixth on beam at the 2008 World Cup in Doha, Qatar. With the team she won the 2010 national championships and won the bronze medal at the 2010 Central American Games. She competed at the World Artistic Gymnastics Championships. She was further active as a collegiale gymnast. She competed for LSU and was part of the 2011 SEC Freshman Academic Honor Roll. Due to her knee injury, she didn't compete.

Personal
Her parents are Ismael Sanabria Jr. and Dory Jean Robles. She has one younger brother, Ismael. She attended Freedom High School, where she maintained a 4.0 GPA. She plans to major in biological sciences.

References

External links
 gopsusports profile
lsusports profile

1992 births
Living people
Puerto Rican female artistic gymnasts
Place of birth missing (living people)
Gymnasts at the 2007 Pan American Games
Pan American Games competitors for Puerto Rico
People from Caguas, Puerto Rico
LSU Tigers women's gymnasts
Penn State Nittany Lions women's gymnasts
Central American and Caribbean Games silver medalists for Puerto Rico
Central American and Caribbean Games bronze medalists for Puerto Rico
Competitors at the 2006 Central American and Caribbean Games
Competitors at the 2010 Central American and Caribbean Games
Central American and Caribbean Games medalists in gymnastics